Stella, a computer program available in three versions (Great Stella, Small Stella and Stella4D), was created by Robert Webb of Australia.  The programs contain a large library of polyhedra which can be manipulated and altered in various ways.

Polyhedra
Polyhedra in Great Stella's library include the Platonic solids, the Archimedean solids, the Kepler-Poinsot solids, the Johnson solids, some Johnson Solid near-misses, numerous compounds including the uniform polyhedra, and other polyhedra.  Operations which can be performed on these polyhedra include stellation, faceting, augmentation, dualization (also called "reciprocation"), creating convex hulls, and others.

All versions of the program enable users to print nets for polyhedra.  These nets may then be assembled into actual three-dimensional polyhedral models of great beauty and complexity.

Stella4D  
In 2007, a Stella4D version was added, allowing the generation and display of four-dimensional polytopes (polychora), including a library of all convex uniform polychora, and all currently known nonconvex star polychora, as well as the uniform duals. They can be selected from a library or generated from user created polyhedral vertex figure files.

Features
Stella provides a configurable workspace comprising several panels. Once a model has been selected from the range available, different views of it may be displayed in each panel. These views can also include  measurements, symmetries and unfolded nets.

A variety of operations may be performed on any polyhedron. In 3D these include: stellation, faceting, augmentation, excavation, drilling and dualising.

Other features include spring network relaxation, generation of the convex hull, and generation of cupolaic blends and related figures.

Release history 

 v1.0 – 20 August 2001 – First release of Stella
 v1.1 – 14 January 2002
 v2.0 – 12 September 2002
 v2.8.7 – 16 November 2004
 v3.0 – 12 June 2005
 v3.5.1 – 10 May 2006
 v4.0 – 13 March 2007 – (Including new "Stella4D")
 v4.4 – 11 January 2008
 v5.0 – 30 September 2012
 v5.4 – 10 May 2014

References 

 (Note: journal was back-dated.  Paper actually written 2003)

Further reading
 (Note: journal was back-dated.  Paper actually written 2004)

External links 

Polyhedra
4-polytopes
3D graphics software